Aroma is one of the twenty provinces of the Bolivian La Paz Department. It is situated in the southern parts of the department. Its seat is Sica Sica (Sika Sika).

Location 
Aroma province is located between 16° 43' and 17° 35' South and between 67° 22' and 68° 23' West. It extends over 120 km from north west to south east, and up to 55 km from north east to south west.

The province is situated on the Bolivian Altiplano south east of Lake Titicaca and borders Ingavi Province in the north west, Pacajes Province in the west, Gualberto Villarroel Province in the south, Oruro Department in the south east, Loayza Province in the east, and Pedro Domingo Murillo Province in the north.

Geography 
Some of the highest mountains of the province are listed below:

Population 
The population of Aroma Province has increased by 80% over the recent two decades:
1992: 65,730 inhabitants (census)
2001: 86,480 inhabitants (census)
2005: 99,162 inhabitants (est.)
2010: 110,418 inhabitants (est.)

45.1% of the population are younger than 15 years old. (1992)

79.9% of the population speak Spanish, 93.9% speak Aymara, and 6.7% Quechua. (2001)

The literacy rate of the population of the province is 78.4%. (1992)

82.1% of the population have no access to electricity, 88.0% have no sanitary facilities. (1992)

69.2% of the population are Catholics, 25.5% are Protestants. (1992)

Division 
The province comprises seven municipios which are further subdivided into cantons.

Villages 
 

Lahuachaca

See also 
 Ch'alla Jawira
 Jach'a Jawira
 Kuntur Amaya
 Urqu Jawira

References

External links 
Population data (Spanish)
Social data (Spanish)

Provinces of La Paz Department (Bolivia)